Rope is a length of fibers that are twisted or braided together

Rope may also refer to:

Wire rope, a length of metallic fibers twisted or braided together

Computing
 Core rope memory,  a ferrite read-only memory
 IpTables Rope, an open-source firewall programming language
 Rope (data structure), a data structure used in computer science

Film, television and theatre
 Rope (play), a 1929 play by Patrick Hamilton
 Rope (film), a 1948 film by Alfred Hitchcock based on the play
 Rope (1957 film), an Australian TV adaptation originally aired by ABC
 Rope (1959 television play), an Australian TV adaptation originally aired by GTV
 The Rope (miniseries), a 2021 French thriller miniseries
 Roped, a 1919 silent film directed by John Ford and starring Harry Carey
 Rudens (lit. The Rope), a 3rd-century BC play by Plautus

Music
 The Rope, a 1986 album by Black Tape for a Blue Girl
 "Rope" (song), by Foo Fighters, 2011

Persons with surname Rope
 Bryce Rope (1923–2013), New Zealand rugby union coach
 Donald Rope (1929–2009), Canadian ice-hockey player
 Ellen Mary Rope (1855–1934), English sculptor
 John Rope (1855 or 1863–1944), White Mountain Apache clan leader and Apache scout
 Margaret Agnes Rope (1882–1953), English stained glass artist (cousin of M E Aldrich Rope)
 M. E. Aldrich Rope (1891–1988), English stained glass artist (cousin of Margaret Agnes Rope)

Other uses
 Colloquial for execution by hanging
 Research Opportunity and Performance Evidence (ROPE), concept used by the Australian Research Council
 Rope, or Corde lisse, an aerial acrobatics attribute/discipline
 Rope (rhythmic gymnastics), a rhythmic gymnastics apparatus
 Rope (torture), an instrument of torture used by the Huguenots
 Rope (unit), any of several units of measurement
 Boundary rope in cricket
 Rope, Cheshire, a civil parish in Cheshire
 Rope climbing, a sport
 Fast-roping (or Fast Rope Insertion Extraction System), a military assault technique

See also 
 Ropes (disambiguation)